The Men's Boxing Tournament at the 1995 Pan American Games was held in Mar del Plata, Argentina from March 11 to March 27. It served as a qualification tournament for the 1996 Summer Olympics in Atlanta, Georgia. First and second place qualified for the Olympic tournament.

Medal winners

Results

Light Flyweight (– 48 kg)

Flyweight (– 51 kg)

Bantamweight (– 54 kg)

Featherweight (– 57 kg)

Lightweight (– 60 kg)

Light Welterweight (– 63.5 kg)

Welterweight (– 67 kg)

Light Middleweight (– 71 kg)

Middleweight (– 75 kg)

Light Heavyweight (– 81 kg)

Heavyweight (– 91 kg)

Super Heavyweight (+ 91 kg)

Super heavyweight event of the 1995 Pan American Games was tarnished by the absence of Cuban legend Roberto Balado, the 1992 Olympic champion, who was winning only gold medals at all events since October 1990, and was one of the most probable finalists if participated, but died in a car crash a year prior to the event. He was substituted by Leonardo Martínez Fiz.

Medal table

See also
Boxing at the 1996 Summer Olympics

References

External links
Results
Amateur Boxing

P
Events at the 1995 Pan American Games
Boxing at the Pan American Games